Shamonino is a rural locality (a village) in Russko-Yurmashsky Selsoviet, Ufimsky District, Bashkortostan, Russia. The population was 258 as of 2010. There are 22 streets.

Geography 
Shamonino is located 24 km southeast of Ufa (the district's administrative centre) by road. Yuzhnaya is the nearest rural locality.

References 

Rural localities in Ufimsky District